Municipal Corporation of Delhi Civic Centre is the tallest building in New Delhi at 101 metres and 28 floors.

Construction 
Built at a cost of Rs 500-650 crore, the building was designed by architect Shirish Malpani. He is a visiting faculty at School of Planning and Architecture, New Delhi. The maintenance of the building has been outsourced to a private company for Rs 8.33 crore/year.

Architecture 
The 28-storeyed MCD Civic Centre comprises five multi-storey blocks, with a total built-up floor area of approximately 1,16,000 sq metres excluding a three-level basement parking facility for about 2,500 equivalent car unit, seven entry and exit gates, eight escalators, 43 passenger and service elevators and 100 per cent power back-up. It is near to Asaf Ali Road.  MCD Civic Centre is surrounded by Tagore Road, Jawahar Lal Nehru Road, Vivekananda Road, and Zakir Hussain College.

It was inaugurated in April 2010, after 15 years of delays, and MCD offices shifted from Delhi Town Hall in Chandni Chowk.

References

Government buildings in Delhi
Local government in Delhi
Municipal buildings in India
Skyscraper office buildings in India